George McNeil (July 26, 1914 – December 24, 1997) was an ice hockey player and coach and baseball player and manager, who represented United Kingdom internationally at both sports.

Baseball
Domestically McNeil played third base for the Leeds Oaks in the Yorkshire-Lancashire League in the United Kingdom. In 1938, at just 24 years of age, he represented the Great Britain national baseball team as player-manager, defeating the United States national baseball team to win the Baseball World Cup.

Ice Hockey
McNeil played for the Richmond Hawks, Brighton Tigers and Earls Court Rangers in the English National League and for the Dundee Tigers in the Scottish National League prior to the Second World War. He may be best remembered as a coach for the Tigers between 1946 and 1949 and for the Falkirk Lions between 1949 and 1954 when he retired. He was inducted to the British Ice Hockey Hall of Fame in 1956.

References

1914 births
1997 deaths
Brighton Tigers players
British Ice Hockey Hall of Fame inductees
Canadian ice hockey defencemen
Canadian ice hockey right wingers
Canadian people of Scottish descent
Earls Court Rangers players
Ice hockey people from Nova Scotia
Place of birth missing
Canadian expatriate ice hockey players in England
Great Britain national baseball team people
Great Britain national baseball team managers
Great Britain national baseball team players
Canadian expatriate baseball players in the United Kingdom